Wechselia is a genus of spiders in the family Thomisidae. It was first described in 1907 by Dahl. , it contains only one species, Wechselia steinbachi, found in Argentina.

References

Thomisidae
Monotypic Araneomorphae genera
Spiders of Argentina